Fulufjellet National Park is an  national park located in Trysil, Norway. Established on 24 April 2012, its eastern border lies along the Norway–Sweden border and borders the Swedish Fulufjället National Park.

References

National parks of Norway
Trysil
Protected areas established in 2012
2012 establishments in Norway